Mr & Mrs Khiladis is an Indian Tamil-language celebrity stunt based reality television series based on the American series Fear Factor. The show first season was premiered on 17 September 2016 on Zee Tamil and also available to watch on digital platform ZEE5. The show was being host by Deepak Dinkar for all the seasons.

Format
The show about 10 real life Tamil television couples fighting against each other for 13 weeks. Once in three episodes, there will be an elimination. This will be done through voting the contestants themselves will vote for a Jodi (couple) that will then have to leave the show.

Seasons overview

Season 1
The first season of the show began airing on 28 May 2016, and ended on 28 August 2016, after airing 28 episodes. The Show host by Deepak Dinkar.

 Title Winners of Mr & Mrs Khiladis 1 : Yuvaraj & Gayathri

Contestants
 Rachitha Mahalakshmi and Dinesh Gopalsamy 
 Myna Nandhini and Karthik Ravichandran (Karthikeyan) 
 Yuvaraj and Gayathri 
 Badava Gopi and Haritha
 Mani and Chrylsheelaa
 Anu and Vignesh
 Minnal Deepa and Ramesh
 Nethran and Deepa
 Adhivith and Archana
 Sarath and Swapna

Season 2
The second season aired on every Saturday and Sunday at 21:30 from 23 June 2018 to 16 September 2018. Deepak Dinkar has officially once again been appointed as the host. The season title winner is Siddharth and his wife Priyadarshini. 

 Title Winners of Mr & Mrs Khiladis 2 : Siddharth & Priyadarshini

Contestants
 Siddharth and Priyadarshini
 Ishvar and Jayashree
 Subbulakshmi and Kamalesh
 Dhanalakshmi and Shiva
 Raghav and Preetha
 Karthik and Rathi
 Anandhi and Ajay
 Farina and Rahman
 Jenifer and Kasivishwanathan
 Singapore Deepan and Sukanya

References

External links 
 Mr & Mrs Khiladis on ZEE5
 

Zee Tamil original programming
Tamil-language reality television series
2016 Tamil-language television series debuts
2016 Tamil-language television seasons
2018 Tamil-language television seasons
Tamil-language game shows
Tamil-language television shows
2018 Tamil-language television series endings
Tamil-language television series based on American television series
Television shows set in Tamil Nadu